This is the Tomb of the Juice is the debut album of Irish funk-rock band Republic of Loose; it was released in June 2004.

The album contains three singles; "Girl I'm Gonna Fuck You Up", "Hold Up" and "Tell More Lies".

The group performed seven of the album's tracks on an episode of RTÉ's Other Voices programme in April 2005.

Track listing
 "Intro" - 0.35
 "Kiodin Man" - 3.53
 "Hold Up!" - 4.07
 "Girl I'm Gonna Fuck You Up" - 5.44
 "Goofy Love" - 4.35
 "Something in the Water" - 3.07
 "Tell More Lies" - 4.24
 "Slow Down" - 6.57
 "Sweet Cola of Mercy" - 4.35
 "Six Sober Sounds" - 4.32
 "Fuck Everybody" - 2.10
 "Ride with Us" - 4.17
 "Dial Jesus for Sweetness" - 3.42
 "Black Bread" - 4.07
 "Lawn Child" - 4.57

Republic of Loose albums
2004 debut albums